Suvorov is a 1941 Soviet film directed by Vsevolod Pudovkin and Mikhail Doller, based on the life of Russian general Alexander Vasilyevich Suvorov (1729 – 1800), one of the few great generals in history who never lost a battle. The film premiered in Russia 23 January 1941 (i.e., before the German attack). It was released as General Suvorov in the USA. In 1941 Pudovkin, Doller, Cherkasov-Sergeyev, and Khanov received the Stalin Prize for the film.

Cast
 Nikolai Cherkasov-Sergeyev as Alexander Vasilyevich Suvorov
 Aleksandr Khanov as Platonych
 Mikhail Astangov as Aleksandr Andreyevich Arakcheyev
 Apollon Yachnitsky as Pavel I
 Georgi Kovrov as Prokhor
 S. Kiligin as Pyotr Bagration
 Vsevolod Aksyonov as Meshchersky
 Aleksandr Antonov as Colonel Tyurin, commander of the Azov regiment
 Aleksandr Khvylya
 Galina Kravchenko as Lopukhina (uncredited)
 Anatoli Solovyov

External links

1941 films
1940s biographical drama films
Soviet biographical drama films
Russian biographical drama films
Mosfilm films
Soviet black-and-white films
Films directed by Vsevolod Pudovkin
1940s war drama films
1940s historical drama films
Soviet historical drama films
Russian historical drama films
Alexander Suvorov
Cultural depictions of Paul I of Russia
Films directed by Mikhail Doller
Soviet war drama films
Russian black-and-white films
Russian war drama films